The Surinamese Labour Party (SPA) is a political party in Suriname. 

In the 2010 legislative elections, the party was part of the New Front for Democracy and Development that won 31.65% of the popular vote and 14 out of 51 seats in the National Assembly. The SPA got one seat out of these 14.

In the 2020 elections, the SPA again won no seats. It contested in only 9 of the districts, and decided against running in Coronie.

Electoral results

Representation

Members of the First Venetiaan Cabinet (1991-1996)

Members of the Second Venetiaan Cabinet (2000-2005)

Members of the Third Venetiaan Cabinet (2005-2010)

Chairmen 

 Fred Derby: 1987-2001
 Siegfried Gilds: 2001-2009
 Guno Castelen: 2009-incumbent

References

Labour parties
Political parties in Suriname
Social democratic parties in South America